Princess Teresa Cristina of Saxe-Coburg and Gotha (23 August 1902 –  24 January 1990), was a German-Brazilian princess of the House of Saxe-Coburg and Gotha.

Early life
She was born Princess Theresia Christiane Maria Josepha Ignatia Benizia Michaela Gabriele Raphaele Gonzaga of Saxe-Coburg and Gotha at the Thüringen in Austria-Hungary, the sixth child of Prince August Leopold of Saxe-Coburg and Gotha and Archduchess Karoline Marie of Austria. Her father was the son of Princess Leopoldina of Brazil, daughter of Emperor Pedro II of Brazil and Teresa Cristina of the Two Sicilies, her namesake. Teresa Cristina was the only grandchild of Leopoldina to retain Brazilian nationality. Through her mother she was also a great-granddaughter of Leopold II, the last Grand Duke of Tuscany.

Marriage and family
Teresa Cristina married in Salzburg on 6 October 1930 to Lamoral, Baron Taxis di Bordogna e Valnigra. Their descendants assumed the surname Tasso de Saxe-Coburgo e Bragança. They had four children:

Carlos Tasso de Saxe-Coburg e Bragança (born 16 July 1931); married firstly Denise Pais de Almeida and secondly Archduchess Walburga of Austria (born 23 July 1942).
Alice Tasso de Saxe-Coburg e Bragança (7 June 1936 – 29 August 2013); married Michele Formentini, Count di Tolmino e Biglia. 
Felipe Tasso de Saxe-Coburg e Bragança (born 3 January 1939); married Anna Maria Duarte Nunes.
Maria Cristina Tasso de Saxe-Coburg e Bragança (born 31 January 1945); married Raimondo Dettori.

She died on 24 January 1990 in Villach, Austria, aged 87.

Ancestry

References

1902 births
1990 deaths
House of Saxe-Coburg-Gotha-Koháry
Princesses of Saxe-Coburg and Gotha